Edim Demir (born 25 August 1985) is a Turkish former professional footballer who played as a forward.

Career
Demir was born in Silifke, Turkey. His contract with Boluspor started on 25 August 2008 and is scheduled to end in May 2011, but was then extended by one year.

References

1985 births
Living people
People from Silifke
Turkish footballers
Association football forwards
Boluspor footballers